The following are lists of American actors:

List of American film actresses
List of American television actresses
List of African-American actors
List of American actors of Irish descent
List of Barbadian American actors
List of Italian-American actors
List of Mexican-American actors
List of Native American actors
List of Romanian American actors
List of Slovene American actors

American